William Brandt's Sons & Co. Ltd  was an Anglo-German merchant bank and accepting house in the early nineteenth and late twentieth century.

History
The bank was established by the Brandts, a well established German mercantile family, from Hamburg. E. H. Brandt opened his first office in London in 1805 where his postal address was Batson's Coffee House. A branch of the firm had also been opened in Archangel, Russia in 1802.

The London business prospered and as a result of growing trade with Russia, it became fully independent in 1865. Some years earlier the firm had to a large extent left the purely merchanting business and turned more to the merchant banking side by giving advances on an acceptance basis against overseas produce shipped, or be to shipped and sold through them.

The firm traded exclusively with Russia (particularly in Archangel, Riga and St. Petersburg) until 1875 when it began trading in Argentine grain movements and meat refrigeration. 

Their Russian interests also included sugar refineries, saw mills, cordage factories, tanneries, iron foundries, cotton mills and wharfs. Several members of the family held prominent positions with Wilhelm becoming consul for the city of Hamburg and in 1832 Edmund became United States consul in Archangel. The firm was the leading shipper in Archangel between 1819 to 1850. 

The London arm took over the Calcutta house of Scholvin and Co. in 1886 and thereby extended its interests to India. The company had the name William Brandt's Sons and Company Limited at the time with offices at 4 Fenchurch Avenue in the City of London.

Brandt had capital of 0.35 million pounds in 1880 rising to 0.75 million pounds by 1904 and one million by 1914. Brandt's was a founding member of the Accepting House Committee that was set up at the beginning of the First World War and acceptances accounted for a substantial part of its business. By 1914, acceptance liabilities in Russia accounted for less than 10 percent of Brandt's business and the largest portion of acceptance business was with the United States (almost 35 percent). The business remained one of London’s leading merchant banks with a large acceptance business from 1850 to 1914. 

The bank is first mentioned in the London Banks directory in 1894. In that year its partners were Alfred Ernst Brandt, Arthur Henry Brandt and Augustus Ferdinand Brandt. Henry Bernhard Brandt and Augustus Philip Brandt also became partners in 1895 but Alfred had ceased to be a partner in the following year. Rudolph Ernst Brandt joined the firm in 1898, replacing Arthur.

They diversified into investment management, property and insurance in the early 1960s. In addition, the bank fully acquired Jensen Motors in 1968. Other subsidiaries included a successful timber and forest products business that was established by a Russian cousin after the revolution. 

Brandt's sold 1/3 of their shares to National and Grindlays Bank in 1965 who then fully acquired the remaining balance in 1976. Its most infamous former employee, John Bingham, 7th Earl of Lucan, resigned from a position he held with the bank. The bank had remained an independent, family-run business for seven generations.

References

 

Economy of the City of London
Investment banks
Defunct banks of the United Kingdom
Banks established in 1805
Banks disestablished in 1976